Kaikhosro II Gurieli (died 1689), of the House of Gurieli, was Prince of Guria, in western Georgia, from 1685 to 1689. He vied for the control of Guria with his uncle, Malakia Gurieli, who he had blinded. Kaikhosro was eventually killed by agents of the Ottoman pasha of Akhaltsikhe, who sought regional hegemony in southwestern Caucasus.

Kaikhosro was the eldest son of Giorgi III Gurieli and Tamar Chijavadze. On Giorgi's death at the battle of Rokiti against King Alexander IV of Imereti in 1684, Kaikhosro and his brothers fled to the protection of Yusuf, the Ottoman pasha of Akhaltsikhe, while Alexander installed their uncle, Malakia, as the ruler of Guria. Next year, Kaikhosro returned with troops provided by the pasha, deposed Malakia, and sent him in exile to Akhaltsikhe. The pasha attempted the reconciliation between the two Gurieli, but Kaikhosro reneged on his promise not to harm Malakia and had his uncle captured and blinded. This offended the pasha, who sent the bey of Şavşat to Guria with a secret instruction to kill Kaikhosro. After hosting the Ottoman dignitary in Guria, Kaikhosro departed for a reciprocal visit. On his way, Kaikhosro was captured, killed, and beheaded. Guria reversed to the blinded Malakia. Kaikhosro was betrothed to Elene, daughter of Prince Giorgi-Malakia Abashidze; the marriage was never consummated and the girl eventually married Kaikhosro's brother Mamia.

References 

1689 deaths
House of Gurieli
17th-century people from Georgia (country)